This is a list of flags used in Colombia. For more information about the national flag, visit the article Flag of Colombia.

National flags

Presidential standards

Military

Army

Navy

Air Force

Police

Civil Ensign

Departments

Municipalities

Political flags

Ethnic groups flags

Historical Flags

Flag Proposal

Burgees of Colombia

See also

 Cundinamarca flags
 Coat of arms of Colombia
 ¡Oh, Gloria Inmarcesible!

External links

 
Colombia
Flags